Resident Evil 4 is an upcoming survival horror game developed and published by Capcom. It is a remake of the 2005 video game of the same name, scheduled for release on PlayStation 4, PlayStation 5, Windows, and Xbox Series X/S on March 24, 2023. The game follows United States Strategic Command Special Agent Leon S. Kennedy, who must save the kidnapped Ashley Graham, daughter of the President of the United States, from the mysterious Los Illuminados cult.

Premise 
Six years after the events of Resident Evil 2, United States Strategic Command Special Agent Leon S. Kennedy is sent on a mission to rescue Ashley Graham, daughter of the President of the United States, from a Spanish village controlled by the violent cult of Los Illuminados. Other characters appearing include Ada Wong, Leon's operator Ingrid Hunnigan, the civilian Luis Sera, and the antagonists Bitores Mendez, Ramon Salazar, and Osmund Saddler.

Gameplay 
Resident Evil 4 is a remake of the 2005 game of the same name. It will feature "over-the-shoulder" third-person shooter gameplay similar to the original game, while drawing from the remakes of Resident Evil 2 (2019) and Resident Evil 3 (2020). In an innovative step to the Resident Evil series, Resident Evil 4 will be the first game to offer six optional control schemes, including one that is styled after the control scheme in the original game. Resident Evil 4 features modernized and improved visuals compared to the original, with a tenser atmosphere, improved character designs and enhanced backgrounds.

As in the original game, the player will organize their inventory with an "attache case". The Merchant returns, allowing the player to buy, upgrade, and trade items. He will provide new side quests that may be completed during the main story. In combat, Leon can roundhouse kick enemies to push them away, as well as new parry mechanics which include blocking attacks from a chainsaw with a knife.

Development 
The original Resident Evil 4 was released for the GameCube in 2005. Development of the remake reportedly began around 2018, led by the studio M-Two. Capcom brought the development in-house in early 2021, led by the Division 1 team, with many staff members who worked on the 2019 remake of Resident Evil 2 returning for Resident Evil 4. Following its reveal on June 3, 2022, Capcom stated that it is being developed "by reimagining the storyline of the game while keeping the essence of its direction, modernizing the graphics and updating the controls to a modern standard". Hirabayashi claims the remake will have the same length as the original Resident Evil 4.

Producer Yoshiaki Hirabayashi said he found the idea of remaking Resident Evil 4 challenging as a result of its popularity. Kazunori Kadoi and Yasuhiro Anpo, who worked on Resident Evil 2 Remake, are acting as directors. Kadoi is supervising gameplay elements, most notably how to use Leon's knife and its endurance after encounters with the enemies. The set appeal is to give players various ways to complete Resident Evil 4. When it comes to quick time events, Capcom aims to reduce them as much as possible. In keeping with the original game, the briefcase was briefly touched to change weapons quickly. Unlike the original game, Leon can carry multiple knives in his inventory to compensate for their limited durability. The development team was split into three groups that worked in three areas of the game: the village, the castle, and the island. It was revealed by the game director that the island will not be cut from the final version of the game. In keeping with the realism, the characters' facial features were based on real people. Leon's in-game facial features will have Eduard Badaluta's likeness.

The team aimed to expand Ashley's characterization and relationship and make the story more horror focused. The characterization of Leon was affected to react more to the enemies to the point he would often insult them. The visuals were carefully developed to improve the idea of horror. The game was developed with the RE Engine. On February 24, 2023, Capcom announced the Japanese voice cast.

Release 
The first teaser trailer was released as a part of PlayStation's June State of Play on June 3, 2022. It is scheduled to release for PlayStation 4, PlayStation 5, Windows, and Xbox Series X/S on March 24, 2023 with support on PS VR2. Despite a release planned for PlayStation 4, the game will not release for Xbox One. A second trailer and additional gameplay were shown during a showcase in October 2022. Preorders include Leon's briefcase and Leon's handgun ammo as charms. A third trailer debuted as a part of PlayStation's State of Play on February 23, 2023. After the rain effects in preview footage drew criticism, Yoshiaki said Capcom would release a patch on the day of the game's release to modify it. A playable demo was announced during a Capcom Spotlight livestream on March 9, 2023, and released immediately afterwards for PlayStation 4, PlayStation 5, Windows, and Xbox Series X/S.

Reception

Resident Evil 4 received "universal acclaim", according to review aggregator Metacritic.

Notes

References

External links 
 

Upcoming video games scheduled for 2023
Bioterrorism in fiction
Capcom games
2020s horror video games
PlayStation 4 games
PlayStation 5 games
Resident Evil games
Science fiction video games
Single-player video games
Video game remakes
Video games about cults
Video games about viral outbreaks
Video games developed in Japan
Video games set in castles
Video games set in Spain
Video games set on fictional islands
Windows games
Xbox Series X and Series S games